Surf City is a town in Pender and Onslow counties in the U.S. state of North Carolina. The population was  1,853 at the 2010 census. It is located on Topsail Island.

The Pender County portion of Surf City is part of the Wilmington Metropolitan Statistical Area, while the Onslow County portion is part of the Jacksonville Metropolitan Statistical Area.

Geography
Surf City is located at  (34.428137, -77.543198).

According to the United States Census Bureau, Surf City has a total area of 5.3 square miles (13.7 km), of which 4.2 square miles (10.9 km)  is land and 1.1 square miles (2.8 km)  (20.45%) is water.

Recent annexations have extended the town limits on the mainland west of Highway 17.

Climate

Demographics

2020 census

As of the 2020 United States census, there were 3,867 people, 1,272 households, and 870 families residing in the town.

2000 census
As of the census of 2000 there were 1,393 people, 689 households, and 403 families residing in the town. The population density was 331.6 people per square mile (128.1/km). There were 2,578 housing units at an average density of 613.7 per square mile (237.0/km). The racial makeup of the town was 97.77% White, 0.43% African American, 0.07% Native American, 0.72% Asian, 0.14% Pacific Islander, 0.22% from other races, and 0.65% from two or more races. Hispanic or Latino of any race were 1.01% of the population.

There were 689 households, out of which 12.6% had children under the age of 18 living with them, 51.5% were married couples living together, 4.9% had a female householder with no husband present, and 41.4% were non-families. 32.4% of all households were made up of individuals, and 7.7% had someone living alone who was 65 years of age or older. The average household size was 2.02 and the average family size was 2.51.

In the town, the population was spread out, with 12.6% under the age of 18, 6.2% from 18 to 24, 25.4% from 25 to 44, 39.6% from 45 to 64, and 16.3% who were 65 years of age or older. The median age was 48 years. For every 100 females, there were 102.2 males. For every 100 females age 18 and over, there were 104.7 males.

The median income for a household in the town was $40,521, and the median income for a family was $48,854. Males had a median income of $36,600 versus $30,000 for females. The per capita income for the town was $25,242. About 9.9% of families and 15.4% of the population were below the poverty line, including 43.3% of those under age 18 and 3.9% of those age 65 or over.

Piers (from south to north)

 Surf City (last 150 feet, to include the Octagon destroyed by Hurricane Florence) 
 Barnacle Bill's (destroyed by Hurricane Fran)
 Scotch Bonnet (destroyed by Hurricane Fran)
 Ocean City (destroyed by Hurricane Fran)

Bridges

Until late 2018, road access to Surf City was mainly via the Topsail Island Swing Bridge, a failing steel truss swing-span bridge, built in 1954, which crossed the Intracoastal Waterway. Planning for a replacement bridge began in 2010, with construction beginning in September 2016. It opened in December 2018, a year ahead of schedule. The unusually wide design is intended to permit three lanes for hurricane evacuations. The contractor was scheduled to remove the old bridge by March 31, 2019. In a letter to residents in January, the Town's mayor, Doug Medlin said, "NCDOT and Balfour Beatty understood the sentimental relationship that the Town of Surf City had for our Swing Bridge. We were given the turn bridge control panel and key as well as the cornerstone from when the bridge was first constructed. These items will be displayed in the new Surf City Town Hall as a historical memorial."

References

External links

 

Populated places established in 1949
Towns in North Carolina
Towns in Onslow County, North Carolina
Towns in Pender County, North Carolina
Beaches of North Carolina
Cape Fear (region)
Landforms of Onslow County, North Carolina
Populated coastal places in North Carolina